An alliance is a relationship among people, groups, or states that have joined together for mutual benefit or to achieve some common purpose, whether or not explicit agreement has been worked out among them. Members of an alliance are called allies. Alliances form in many settings, including political alliances, military alliances, and business alliances. When the term is used in the context of war or armed struggle, such associations may also be called allied powers, especially when discussing World War I or World War II.

A formal military alliance is not required for being perceived as an ally—co-belligerence, fighting alongside someone, is enough. According to this usage, allies become so not when concluding an alliance treaty but when struck by war.

When spelled with a capital "A", "Allies" usually denotes the countries who fought together against the Central Powers in World War I (the Allies of World War I), or those who fought against the Axis Powers in World War II (the Allies of World War II). The term has also been used by the United States Army to describe the countries that gave assistance to South Vietnam during the Vietnam War.

The Allied Powers in World War I (also known as the Entente Powers) were initially the United Kingdom, France, the Russian Empire, Belgium, Serbia, Montenegro and Japan, joined later by Italy, Portugal, Romania, the United States, Greece and Brazil. Some, such as the Russian Empire, withdrew from the war before the armistice due to revolution or defeat.

After the end of World War II and during the Cold War, the North Atlantic Treaty Organization (NATO) was formed as a political and military alliance that promotes anti-communist values.

More recently, the term "Allied forces" has also been used to describe the coalition of the Gulf War, as opposed to forces the Multi-National Forces in Iraq which are commonly referred to as "Coalition forces" or, as by the George W. Bush administration, "the coalition of the willing".

Effects 
Scholars are divided as to the impact of alliances. Several studies find that defensive alliances deter conflict. One study questions these findings, showing that alliance commitments deterred conflict in the prenuclear era but has no statistically meaningful impact on war in the postnuclear era. Another study finds that while alliance commitments deter conflict between sides with a recent history of conflict, alliances tend to provoke conflicts between states without such a history.

A 2000 study in the Journal of Conflict Resolution found that allies fulfill their alliance commitments approximately 75% of the time. Most research suggests that democracies are more reliable allies than non-democracies. A 2004 study did however question whether alliance commitments by democracies are more durable. A 2018 study updated and extended the data from the 2000 Journal of Conflict Resolution study and found that allies only fulfill their commitments about 50% of the time from 1816 to 2003. According to the study, "States honored their alliance commitments 66% of the time prior to 1945 but the compliance rate drops to 22% from 1945 to 2003. Moreover, the rates of fulfillment for defense pacts (41%) and nonaggression pacts (37%) are dramatically lower than offensive alliances (74%) and neutrality agreements (78%)."

One of the most profound effects of alliances can be seen in technological innovation, due to conduits of knowledge flows that are open between allies but closed between rivals.

International opinion

According to a 2017 poll by WIN/GIA, the United States was the most preferred ally internationally. Russia and China, who preferred one another, both trailed America globally. Four countries, Bulgaria, Greece, Slovenia and Turkey, preferred Russia, despite being members of NATO.

In Pakistan, 72% of respondents preferred ties to China, the largest margin of any country surveyed, while 46% of Bangladesh preferred India. A total of 22 countries indicated a preference for the United Kingdom at a rate of 10% or more, but the United States was the only country to prefer Britain over any other, at a rate of 43%. Five countries preferred France at a rate of 10% or more, led by Belgium at a rate of 25%. A single country, Iraq, expressed no preference, while three other countries, Lebanon, Palestine, and Slovenia, expressed no preference at a rate of 11% or more, although at a smaller rate than their preference for Russia on the part of Lebanon and Slovenia, and China on the part of Palestine. Kosovo reported the most unified opinion, preferring the United States at a rate of 92%, while Russia's most unified supporters were Mongolia (71%), Armenia (67%) and Serbia (56%). In total, 21 countries expressed a preference for America at a rate of 50% or more. 

<div style="font-size: 90%">

</div style>

See also 
 Neutral country
 Allies of World War I
 Allies of World War II
 Airline alliance
 Business alliance
 Military alliance
 Political alliance
 Therapeutic alliance, the relationship between a healthcare professional and a client (or patient)
 Bandwagoning

References

Bibliography

External links

 

Diplomacy